Julien Fourgeaud (April 25, 1980 – August 6, 2014) ex-Rovio's digital services product strategist and co-founder of Scarlet Motors.

Biography

His career began at Nokia, contributing in projects such ESeries and NSeries handsets, as the transition from keypad to touch interface, and leading the major effort behind third-party integration for the N97 in 2009, based on the Symbian OS, who was developed by a Symbian's community led by the Symbian Foundation who have Julien as their spokesperson.

At Rovio, Fourgeaud was involved in the development of new services and products.

References

External links
Julien Fourgeaud on Facebook
Julien Fourgeaud on Twitter

2014 deaths
1980 births